Fry's Gap is an unincorporated community in Cherokee County, located in the U.S. state of Texas.

References

External links
 
 Forgotten Communities of Cherokee County: Fry's Gap

Unincorporated communities in Cherokee County, Texas
Unincorporated communities in Texas